Krome Studios Melbourne, originally Beam Software, was an Australian video game development studio founded in 1980 by Alfred Milgrom and Naomi Besen and based in Melbourne, Australia. Initially formed to produce books and software to be published by Melbourne House, a company they had established in London in 1977, the studio operated independently from 1987 until 1999, when it was acquired by Infogrames, who changed the name to Infogrames Melbourne House Pty Ltd.. In 2006 the studio was sold to Krome Studios.

The name Beam was a contraction of the names of the founders: Naomi Besen and Alfred Milgrom.

History

Home computer era 
In the early years, two of Beam's programs were milestones in their respective genres. The Hobbit, a 1982 text adventure by Philip Mitchell and Veronika Megler, sold more than a million copies. It employed an advanced parser by Stuart Richie and had real-time elements. Even if the player didn't enter commands, the story would move on. In 1985 Greg Barnett's two-player martial arts game The Way of the Exploding Fist helped define the genre of one-on-one fighting games on the home computer. The game won Best Overall Game at the Golden Joystick Awards.

In 1987 Beam's UK publishing arm, Melbourne House, was sold to Mastertronic for £850,000. Beam chairman Alfred Milgrom recounted, "...around 1987 a lot of our U.K. people went on to other companies and at around the same time the industry was moving from 8-bit to 16-bit. It was pretty chaotic. We didn't have the management depth at that time to run both the publishing and development sides of things, so we ended up selling off the whole Melbourne House publishing side to Mastertronic." Subsequent games were released through varying publishers. The 1988 fighting games Samurai Warrior and Fist +, the third instalment in the Exploding Fist series, were published through Telecomsoft's Firebird label. 1988 also saw the release of space-shoot'em-up Bedlam, published by GO!, one of U.S. Gold's labels, and The Muncher, published by Gremlin Graphics.

Shift to consoles and PCs 
In 1987 Nintendo granted a developer's licence for the NES and Beam developed games on that platform for US and Japanese publishers. Targeted at an Australian audience, releases such as Aussie Rules Footy and International Cricket for the NES proved successful. In 1992 they released the original title Nightshade, a dark superhero comedy game. The game was meant to be the first part in a series, but no sequels were ever made; however, it served as the basis for Shadowrun. Released in 1993, Shadowrun also used an innovative dialogue system using the acquisition of keywords which could be used in subsequent conversations to initiate new branches in the dialogue tree. Also in 1993 they released Baby T-Rex, a Game Boy platform game that the developer actively sought to adapt the game to a number of different licensed properties in different countries around the world including the animated film We're Back! in North America and the puppet character Agro in their home country of Australia.

In 1997, Beam relaunched the Melbourne House brand, under which they published the PC titles Krush Kill 'n' Destroy (KKND), and the sequels KKND Xtreme and KKND2: Krossfire. They released KKND2 in South Korea well before they released it in the American and European markets, and pirated versions of the game were available on the internet before it was available in stores in the U.S. They were the developers of the 32-bit versions of Norse By Norse West: The Return of the Lost Vikings for the Sega Saturn, PlayStation and PC in 1996. They also helped produce SNES games such as WCW SuperBrawl Wrestling, Super Smash TV and an updated version of International Cricket titled Super International Cricket. They ported the Sega Saturn game Bug! to Windows 3.x in August 1996.

1998 saw a return to RPGs with Alien Earth, again with a dialogue tree format. Also in 1998, the studio developed racing games DethKarz and GP 500.

In 1999 Beam Software was acquired by Infogrames and renamed to Infogrames Melbourne House Pty Ltd.

2000s 
They continued to cement a reputation as a racing game developer with Le Mans 24 Hours and Looney Tunes: Space Race (both Dreamcast and PlayStation 2), followed by Grand Prix Challenge (PlayStation 2), before going into third-person shooters with Men in Black II: Alien Escape (PlayStation 2, GameCube).

In 2004 the studio released Transformers for the PlayStation 2 games console based on the then current Transformers Armada franchise by Hasbro. The game reached the top of the UK PlayStation 2 games charts, making it Melbourne House's most successful recent title.

The studio then completed work on PlayStation 2 and PlayStation Portable ports of Eden's next-generation Xbox 360 title Test Drive: Unlimited.

In December 2005, Atari decided to shift away from internal development, seeking to sell its studios, including Melbourne House. In November 2006, Krome Studios acquired Melbourne House from Atari and was renamed to Krome Studios Melbourne. It was closed on 15 October 2010, along with the main Brisbane office. Next to the game development, Beam Software also had the division Smarty Pants Publishing Pty Ltd., that created software titles for kids, as well as the proprietary video compression technology VideoBeam, and Famous Faces, a facial motion capture hardware and software solution.

Games

As Beam Software 
 1982: Strike Force (TRS-80), Hungry Horace, Horace Goes Skiing, Horace and the Spiders, The Hobbit, Penetrator (Commodore 64, Microbee, Timex Sinclair 2068, TRS-80, ZX Spectrum)
 1983: H.U.R.G: High-Level User-Friendly Real-Time Games Designer (ZX Spectrum) 
 1984: Castle of Terror (Commodore 64, ZX Spectrum), Hampstead (Commodore 64, ZX Spectrum), Mugsy (ZX Spectrum), Sherlock (Commodore 64, ZX Spectrum), Zim Sala Bim (Commodore 64)
 1985: Gyroscope, Lord of the Rings: Game One, Terrormolinos, The Way of the Exploding Fist (Acorn Electron, Amstrad CPC, BBC Micro, Commodore 16, Commodore 64, ZX Spectrum)
 1986: Asterix and the Magic Cauldron (Amstrad CPC, Commodore 64, ZX Spectrum), Fist: The Legend Continues (Antstream, Commodore 64, ZX Spectrum), Judge Dredd (Commodore 64, ZX Spectrum), Knuckle Busters (Commodore 64, ZX Spectrum), Mugsy's Revenge, Rock 'n' Wrestle
 1987: Bad Street Brawler (Commodore 64, MS-DOS, ZX Spectrum), Inspector Gadget and the Circus of Fear (Amstrad CPC, BBC Micro, Commodore 64, ZX Spectrum), Shadows of Mordor (Amstrad CPC, Apple II, Commodore 64, Macintosh, MS-DOS, ZX Spectrum), Street Hassle (Commodore 64, MS-DOS, NES, ZX Spectrum) 
 1988: Samurai Warrior: The Battles of Usagi Yojimbo (Amstrad CPC, Commodore 64, ZX Spectrum), The Muncher (Commodore 64, ZX Spectrum)
 1989: Back to the Future (NES), Bad Street Brawler (NES), Aussie Games (Commodore 64, ZX Spectrum)
 1990: Back to the Future Part II & III (NES), Dash Galaxy in the Alien Asylum (NES), Boulder Dash (Game Boy), NBA All-Star Challenge (Game Boy), The Punisher (NES), Road Blasters (NES), Bigfoot (NES)
 1991: Choplifter II (Game Boy), Hunt for Red October (Game Boy, NES), Smash TV (NES), Family Feud (NES), J. R. R. Tolkien's Riders of Rohan (MS-DOS), Aussie Rules Footy (NES), Power Punch II (NES), Star Wars (NES)
 1992: Aussie Rules Footy (NES), International Cricket (NES), Nightshade (NES), T2: The Arcade Game (Game Boy), NBA All-Star Challenge 2 (Game Boy), Tom and Jerry (Game Boy), Super Smash TV (SNES), George Foreman's KO Boxing (Game Boy)
 1993: Baby T-Rex (Game Boy), We're Back BC (Game Boy), Agro Soar (Game Boy), Blades of Vengeance (Genesis), NFL Quarterback Club (Game Boy), Radical Rex (Genesis), Shadowrun (SNES), MechWarrior (SNES), Super High Impact (Genesis, SNES), Tom and Jerry - Frantic Antics (Genesis)
 1994: Choplifter III (SNES), The Simpsons: Itchy & Scratchy in Miniature Golf Madness (Game Boy), Radical Rex (SNES), Super Smash TV (GG, SMS), Solitaire FunPak (Game Boy), Stargate (Game Boy), Super International Cricket (SNES), WCW: The Main Event (Game Boy)
 1995: True Lies (Game Boy, Genesis, SNES); The Dame Was Loaded (Macintosh, MS-DOS)
 1995: Bug! (PC port), Cricket 96 (MS-DOS)
 1996: 5 in One Fun Pak (GG); WildC.A.T.S (SNES)
 1997: Caesars Palace (PlayStation), Cricket 97 (MS-DOS, Windows)
 1997: Krush, Kill 'n' Destroy (MS-DOS, Windows)
 1998: Dethkarz (Windows)
 1998: NBA Action 98 (PC)
 1998: KKnD 2: Krossfire (PC, PlayStation)
 1999: GP 500 (PC)

As Infogrames Melbourne House/Atari Melbourne House/Krome Studios Melbourne

References

External links
 Official website via Internet Archive
 

Australian companies established in 1980
Australian companies disestablished in 2010
Companies based in Melbourne
Defunct video game companies of Australia
Golden Joystick Award winners
Video game development companies
Video game companies established in 1980
Video game companies disestablished in 2010